The Cat Who Knew Shakespeare is the seventh book in The Cat Who series by Lilian Jackson Braun, published in 1988.

Plot summary
Jim Qwilleran, a newspaperman, and his Siamese cats, Koko and Yum Yum, enjoy his inherited wealth in Moose County, Michigan, particularly in its county seat, Pickax City. Qwilleran investigates a mysterious accidental death of a newspaper publisher with the help of his cats, who communicate with him by knocking various Shakespeare plays from his shelf.

References

1988 American novels
Knew Shakespeare
Novels about cats